The 2019 Irish budget was the Irish Government budget for the 2019 fiscal year was presented to Dáil Éireann on 9 October 2018 by Minister for Finance Paschal Donohoe, his second as Minister for Finance.

Summary
		
 The cost of a packet of 20 cigarettes to go up by €0.50, to bring the total cost of a pack to €12.70.
 Duties on alcohol go unchanged.
 No changes in the price of diesel or petrol.
 The VAT rate for the tourism and hospitality sector increases from 9% to 13.5%.
 Social Welfare payments to rise by €5.
 Christmas bonus to Social Welfare recipients to be restored to 100%.
 Government to commit €1.25 billion for the delivery of 10,000 new social homes in 2019. 
 The Garda budget will rise by €60 million while the defense sector is to benefit from an extra €29 million.
 The minimum wage is to be increased to €9.80 per hour.

References

External links
2019 at Tax Institute
Irish budget, 2019 at Irish Independent

2018 in Irish politics
Budget
2019 government budgets
2019 in Irish politics
Budget
32nd Dáil
18
Budget